Latvia competed at the 2008 Summer Olympics in Beijing, China. It was Latvia's 9th appearance in Summer Olympics.

Medalists

Athletics

Men
Track & road events

Field events

Combined events – Decathlon

Women
Track & road events

Field events

Combined events – Heptathlon

* The athlete who finished in second place, Lyudmila Blonska of the Ukraine, tested positive for a banned substance. Both the A and the B tests were positive, therefore Blonska was stripped of her silver medal, and Grabuste moved up a position.

Basketball

Women's tournament

Roster

Group play

Canoeing

Sprint

Qualification Legend: QS = Qualify to semi-final; QF = Qualify directly to final

Cycling

Road

BMX

Judo

Modern pentathlon

Shooting

Men

Swimming

Men

Tennis

Volleyball

Beach

Weightlifting

References

External links
Official page of 2008 Latvian Olympic team

Nations at the 2008 Summer Olympics
2008
Summer Olympics